Corporation, often referred to as Corp by locals, is an independent live music venue and nightclub located in the city centre of Sheffield, England. In addition to hosting live music from touring bands, Corporation hosts club nights which play a variety of alternative, pop and rock music.

Overview

Layout 
Corporation is located in the Devonshire Quarter of Sheffield City Centre. Located on three floors, the club contains six bars throughout four rooms: the main arena, small arena, upstairs, and The Local Authority.  The upstairs room is opened only during club nights and has a balcony overlooking the lower room's dance floor.  The Local Authority was established as an additional room in 2013 and is opened on club nights as an extension to the main club and serves on non-club nights as a "mini club".

Club nights 
Weekly club nights are held on Mondays (Monday Corp), Wednesdays (Skint), Fridays (Drop) and Saturdays (Dirty Deeds).

Live acts 
Many bands and artists, such as Bring Me the Horizon, Lamb of God, Slash (musician), Soulfly and Alestorm have played at Corporation.    The Resistanz Festival, an annual festival of industrial, synthetic and electronic music was held over Easter weekend at Corporation until 2016.  Live shows are all standing-only events viewed in either the main arena or small arenas.

Awards and recognition 
Corporation was voted the best nightclub in Sheffield by the readers of The Star, beating The Leadmill by 800 votes.

The regular club nights hosted at Corporation (Monday Corp, Skint, Drop and Dirty Deeds) are frequently placed among the best in Sheffield and Northern England in general. All of Corporation's weekly club nights attract thousands of people every week, including students from both of Sheffield’s Universities. 

Corporation is also noted for the blue pint, its signature drink, consisting of 3 shots of vodka and a blue soft drink mixed in a pint glass. There are also red, green and orange variants.

History 
Corporation was originally based on Bank Street, near Castle Market, in a building that had been occupied by a succession of different nightclubs.  The building itself was opened in 1967 as The Cavendish Club, was renamed in 1970 to Bailey's Nightclub, again in 1978 to Romeo and Juliet's Nightclub and once more to Cairo Jax in 1985.  Cairo Jax closed in 1997, after which Corporation began operations there. In addition to the two separate dance-floors, connected by a main entrance corridor and also one further back, there was a Skate Ramp area and a selection of video games, with alcoves to relax in.

In 2002, Corporation moved to its current location on Milton Street.

References

External links 
 
Corp Merch

Nightclubs in Sheffield